Aghcheh Kohel (also Romanized as Āghcheh Kohel; also known as Āqcheh Kohel) is a village in Gonbar Rural District, in the Central District of Osku County, East Azerbaijan Province, Iran. At the 2006 census, its population was 233, in 53 families.

References 

Populated places in Osku County